Springvale is a suburb of Whanganui, in the Whanganui District and Manawatū-Whanganui region of New Zealand's North Island.

An extension to the residential urban boundary was proposed in 2018 to provide homes for another 575 homes. The extension faced opposition.

As of 2018, homes in Springvale are among the fastest selling in the country, with the average house taking just 12 days to sell.

In 2019, Whanganui Māori proposed naming a new street Te Repo to recognise the wetlands that previously existed in the area, but the road was ultimately named after local sculptor Joan Morrell.

Springvale Park

Springvale Park is Whanganui's main sports hub, featuring fields, hardwood courts, swimming pools, a stadium and a bike track.

It hosts a range of North Island and national sports fixtures, like basketball and badminton.

The bike park component took 18 months to construct, and extensively vandalised shortly after opened in December 2018.

Demographics

It had a population of 3,372 at the 2018 New Zealand census, an increase of 258 people (8.3%) since the 2013 census, and an increase of 360 people (12.0%) since the 2006 census. There were 1,446 households. There were 1,554 males and 1,815 females, giving a sex ratio of 0.86 males per female, with 579 people (17.2%) aged under 15 years, 525 (15.6%) aged 15 to 29, 1,359 (40.3%) aged 30 to 64, and 912 (27.0%) aged 65 or older.

Ethnicities were 84.3% European/Pākehā, 15.2% Māori, 3.0% Pacific peoples, 6.7% Asian, and 2.3% other ethnicities (totals add to more than 100% since people could identify with multiple ethnicities).

The proportion of people born overseas was 14.9%, compared with 27.1% nationally.

Although some people objected to giving their religion, 45.7% had no religion, 42.2% were Christian, 1.1% were Hindu, 0.1% were Muslim, 0.6% were Buddhist and 2.2% had other religions.

Of those at least 15 years old, 423 (15.1%) people had a bachelor or higher degree, and 642 (23.0%) people had no formal qualifications. The employment status of those at least 15 was that 1,185 (42.4%) people were employed full-time, 405 (14.5%) were part-time, and 75 (2.7%) were unemployed.

Education

The Springvale Playcentre opened in 1968 and celebrated its 50th anniversary in 2018.

References 

Suburbs of Whanganui